Guy is a French and English surname. Notable people with the surname include:

Athol Guy (born 1940), Australian musician
Barry Guy (born 1947), British composer
Billy Guy (1936–2002), American singer
Brent Guy (born 1960), American football coach
Buddy Guy (born 1936), American guitarist
Charles A. Guy (d. 1985), American newspaper owner and editor
Charles H. Guy (1924–2010), American football and lacrosse player and coach
Charles L. Guy (1856–1930), American politician and judge from New York
Constantin Guys (1802–1892), French journalist
Edna Guy (1907–1982), American dancer
Edna Guy (artist) (1897–1969), British artist 
Étienne Guy (1774–1820), Canadian surveyor and politician
Fabrice Guy (born 1968), French skier
Frances Guy (born 1959) British former ambassador, UN Women's representative in Iraq
Fred Guy (1897–1971), American jazz banjo player and guitarist
Gary Guy (born 1952), Australian rules footballer
Georgia Guy (born 1993), New Zealand cricketer
Greg Guy (born 1971), American basketball player
Henry Lewis Guy (1887–1956), British mechanical engineer
James Guy (disambiguation)
Jasmine Guy (born 1962), American actress
Jean Guy (1922–2013), First Lady of North Dakota
John Guy (governor) (died 1629), English merchant and Governor of Newfoundland
John Guy (historian) (born 1949), British historian
Kyle Guy (born 1997), American basketball player
Lawrence Guy (born 1990), American football player
Lewis Guy (born 1985), English footballer
L. Ruth Guy (1913–2006), American educator and pathologist; Texas Women's Hall of Fame
Mark Guy (born 1964), American football player
Matthew Guy (born 1974), Australian politician
Morais Guy, Jamaican politician
Nathan Guy (born 1970), New Zealand politician
P.L.O. Guy (1885–1952), British archaeologist
Phil Guy (1940–2008), American guitarist
Ray Guy (1949–2022), American football player
Ray Guy (humorist) (1939–2013), Canadian journalist and writer
Richard K. Guy (1916–2020), British mathematician
Rosa Guy (1925–2012), American writer
Scott Guy (died 2010), New Zealand murder victim
Thomas Guy (1644–1724), British founder of Guy's Hospital
Trent Guy (born 1987), American football player
William Guy (1810–1885), British physician
William L. Guy (1919–2013), American politician

English-language surnames
French-language surnames